The Dominican Summer League Rojos were a Minor League Baseball team of the Dominican Summer League based in Boca Chica, Dominican Republic, from 2013 to 2017. The team played in the Boca Chica South division and was affiliated with the Cincinnati Reds.

External links
 DSL Reds

Defunct Dominican Summer League teams
Baseball teams in the Dominican Republic
Cincinnati Reds minor league affiliates